Launch Complex A or LC-A at the Point Arguello Naval Air Station in California, United States, subsequently Point Arguello Launch Complex A or PALC-A at the Vandenberg Air Force Base, is a launch complex that was used for a number of sounding rocket launches between 1959 and 1966. It was originally built as Launch Complex A or LC-A at the Point Arguello Naval Air Station, and was subsequently transferred to Vandenberg Air Force Base as PALC-A following the merger of Point Arguello into Vandenberg AFB in 1964.

Blue Scout Junior, Astrobee, Black Brant, DAC Roc, Honest John-Nike-Nike, Javelin, Journeyman, Nike-Asp and Seagull rockets were launched from the complex whilst it was active.

Launch history

References 

 
 

Launch Complex A